Champney is a surname. Notable people with the surname include:

Anthony Champney (born 1569), English Roman Catholic priest and controversialist
Benjamin Champney (1817–1907), American painter whose name has become synonymous with White Mountain art of the 19th century
Clive Champney, British former continuity announcer for Border Television
Elizabeth Williams Champney (1850–1922), American author of numerous articles and novels, most of which focused on foreign locations
James Wells Champney (1843–1903), American genre and portrait painter

See also
Champneys (disambiguation)
Champney's West, Canada